Monica Ali FRSL (born 20 October 1967) is a British writer of Bangladeshi and English heritage. In 2003, she was selected as one of the "Best of Young British Novelists" by Granta magazine based on her unpublished manuscript; her debut novel, Brick Lane, was published later that year. It was shortlisted for the Man Booker Prize. It was adapted as a 2007 film of the same name. She has also published three other novels. Her fifth novel, Love Marriage, was published by Virago Press in February 2022 and became an instant Sunday Times bestseller.

Early life and education
Ali was born in Dhaka, East Pakistan (now Bangladesh) in 1967 to a Bangladeshi father and an English mother. When she was three, her family moved to Bolton, England. Her father is originally from the district of Mymensingh. She went to Bolton School and then studied philosophy, politics and economics at Wadham College, Oxford.

Brick Lane
Brick Lane is a street at the heart of London's Bangladeshi community. Ali's 2003 novel of the same name follows the life of Nazneen, a Bangladeshi woman who moves to London at the age of 18, to marry an older man, Chanu. They live in Tower Hamlets. At first her English consists only of sorry and thank you; the novel explores her life and adaptations in the community, as well as the character of Chanu, and their larger ethnic community.  An additional narrative strand covers the experiences of Nazneen's sister, Hasina, through the device of her correspondence.

Reception

The Observer described Chanu as "one of the novel's foremost miracles: twice her age, with a face like a frog, a tendency to quote Hume and the boundless doomed optimism of the self-improvement junkie, he is both exasperating and, to the reader at least, enormously loveable." Geraldine Bedell wrote in The Observer that the "most vivid image of the marriage is of her [Nazneen] cutting her husband's corns, a task she seems required to perform with dreadful regularity. [Her husband] is pompous and kindly, full of plans, none of which ever come to fruition, and then of resentment at Ignorant Types who don't promote him or understand his quotations from Shakespeare or his Open University race, ethnicity and class module."

The novel was well received by critics in the United Kingdom and the United States, and shortlisted for the Man Booker Prize.

However, the novel provoked controversy within the Bangladeshi community in Britain. Some groups thought Ali had negatively portrayed people from the Sylhet Division, as they constitute the majority of the Bangladeshi immigrants living in the Brick Lane community.

Film adaptation
In 2007, the book was adapted as a film of the same name. Starring the Indian actress Tannishtha Chatterjee, the film was distributed both in the UK and internationally.

When production was underway in 2006, some of the Bangladeshi community opposed Ruby Films' intention to film parts of the novel in the Brick Lane area. They formed the Campaign Against Monica Ali's Film Brick Lane.

The writer and activist Germaine Greer expressed support for the campaign, writing in The Guardian:
As British people know little and care less about the Bangladeshi people in their midst, their first appearance as characters in an English novel had the force of a defining caricature ... [S]ome of the Sylhetis of Brick Lane did not recognise themselves. Bengali Muslims smart under an Islamic prejudice that they are irreligious and disorderly, the impure among the pure, and here was a proto-Bengali writer with a Muslim name, portraying them as all of that and more.

Greer criticised Monica Ali's "lack of authenticity", as she had never spent much time in the Brick Lane community, and no longer spoke the Bengali language fluently. The writer Salman Rushdie criticised Greer for getting involved, saying that her statements were "philistine, sanctimonious, and disgraceful, but ... not unexpected."

Love Marriage
After a ten-year hiatus, during which Ali suffered a 'loss of confidence' according to an interview in The Guardian, she returned with her fifth novel, Love Marriage. Described in The Times' culture section as a 'literary love story', the book is set in London in 2016–2017, and tells the story of Yasmin Ghorami, a 26-year-old junior doctor, who is engaged to be married to fellow doctor, Joe Sangster. In the same article, journalist Rosie Kinchen argues that we are living in 'a time when feelings are so fraught and people seem to be itching to taking offence', going on to say 'This is precisely why it's a good time to have her back. Nuance is one of Ali's greatest skills; she can lay out a character's flaws, self-delusions and inconsistencies and then make you love them anyway.'

In a review in the Times Literary Supplement, novelist Tash Aw described it as a 'rich, sensitive and gloriously entertaining novel...brimming with extremely funny moments of excruciating social comedy.' Writing in The Financial Times, novelist Susie Boyt called it 'wildly entertaining…a bold and generous book'. David Sexton in the Sunday Times concurred, describing Love Marriage as:

'Enormously satisfying in its inventions and observations, and its exploration of cultural diversity in Britain. At once touching and satirical…engrossing and enjoyable'.
 
Critical responses were overwhelmingly positive, propelling the novel into The Sunday Times' bestseller list in its first week of publication. Ali announced on her website that television rights to Love Marriage had been sold to New Pictures after a 'heated auction', and that it is currently in development with the BBC.

Views
Ali opposed the British government's attempt to introduce the Racial and Religious Hatred Act 2006. She discussed this in her contribution to Free Expression Is No Offence, a collection of essays published by Penguin in association with English PEN in 2005.

Ali coined the term of "marketplace for outrage" in an article in The Guardian in which she gives her response to events around the filming of Brick Lane.

From 2015 to 2020, Ali served as a trustee for the Saint Giles Trust, a charity which helps ex-offenders and other marginalised people, and wrote about the need to help newly-released prisoners. 

In 2020, Ali was appointed Patron of Hopscotch Women's Centre, a charity that was originally set up by Save the Children to support ethnic minority families who had come to join their partners in the UK. The organisation became independent in 1998 and continues to empower women and girls to achieve their full potential.

Marks & Spencer's campaign
In 2013, Ali was announced as one of several new models for Marks & Spencer's 'Womanism' campaign. Subtitled "Britain's leading ladies", the campaign saw Ali appear alongside British women from various fields, including pop singer Ellie Goulding, double Olympic gold medal-winning boxer Nicola Adams, and actress Helen Mirren.

Personal life
Ali lives in South London with her husband, Simon Torrance, a management consultant. They have two children.

Books
 Brick Lane (2003), Doubleday
The Weekenders: Adventures in Calcutta (short story), Ebury (2004)
The End of the Affair (introduction), Vintage Classics (2004)
Free Expression is No Offence (essay), English PEN (2005)
 Alentejo Blue (2006), Doubleday
The Painter of Signs (introduction), Penguin Classics (2006)
 In the Kitchen (2009), Doubleday
 Untold Story (2011), Scribner
Dangerous Edges of Graham Greene (afterword), Continuum (2011)
Closure: Contemporary Black British Short Stories (short story), Peepal Tree (2015)
Refugee Tales III (essay), Comma Press (2019)
 Love Marriage (2022), Little, Brown

See also
 British Bangladeshi
 List of British Bangladeshis
 List of English writers

References

Notes

Sources
 Saykar, Satish. 'PORTRAYAL OF MUSLIM WOMEN CHARACTERS IN MONICAALI'S BRICK LANE'. Golden Research Thoughts.2013 http://oldgrt.lbp.world/ArticleDetails.aspx?id=2242

Further reading

  Pdf.
Pereira-Ares, Naomi, "Fashion, Dress and Identity in South Asian Diaspora Narratives: From the Eighteenth Century to Monica Ali": Palgrave Macmillan.
Ranasinha, Ruvani, "Contemporary Diaspora South Asian Women's Fiction: Gender, Narration and Globalisation": Palgrave Macmillan.

External links
 
Simply A Writer, BBC Radio 4
On Authenticity, BBC Radio 4
Talking of Empire, BBC Radio 4
Writers Make Worlds, interview with Bhagya Somashekar
Interview with Mick Brown, Telegraph
The Outrage Economy, The Guardian 
Royal Rebel, Ali's essay on Princess Diana, The Guardian
 Brick Lane's reluctant queen of outrage. Sunday Times
 Biography from the international literature festival berlin
 Interview with Monica Ali at Minnesota Public Radio
 Sanchita Ali considers the novel 'Brick Lane' on the London Fictions website

1967 births
Living people
Bangladeshi emigrants to England
Bangladeshi people of English descent
British people of Bangladeshi descent
Bangladeshi women writers
Bangladeshi writers
British women novelists
21st-century British novelists
British Asian writers
21st-century British women writers
British Book Award winners
Writers from London
People from Dhaka
People from Bolton
People educated at Bolton School
Alumni of Wadham College, Oxford
Alumni of Middlesex University
Fellows of the Royal Society of Literature